A K M Siddiq, born Abul Khair Muhammad Siddiq, was an academic from Bangladesh who was the 18th Vice-Chancellor of Dhaka University.

Early life 
Siddiq was a PhD from the University of Saskatchewan in Physics. He joined the University of Dhaka in 1950.

Career 

Siddiq was the Vice-Chancellor of the University of Dhaka from 21 March 1983 to 16 August 1983.

Siddiq was the Pro-Vice Chancellor of the University of Dhaka from 24 August 1981 to 22 August 1985.

Death 
Siddiq died on 31 August 2018 in Gulshan, Dhaka, Bangladesh. He was buried in Manikganj District.

References 

Date of birth missing
Year of birth missing
Vice-Chancellors of the University of Dhaka
2018 deaths
University of Saskatchewan alumni
People from Manikganj District